Sapera is a form of dance from India practised by the Romani peoples.

Sapera may also refer to:
 Sapera (Muslim), Muslim community found in the state of Bihar in India
 Sapera caste, Hindu caste found in North India